, also known as , is a Japanese voice actress. She was associated with 81 Produce. and is now associated with Aqua Place. Her major roles include Tenchi Nanmi in Daa! Daa! Daa!, Eris in Orphen Revenge, and Chisato in Vampire Princess Miyu.

Filmography

Anime

Video games

Overseas dubbing

References

External links
 Official agency profile 
 

1977 births
Living people
Japanese voice actresses
Voice actresses from Yamanashi Prefecture
81 Produce voice actors